Quinn Marcus Johnson (born September 30, 1986) is a former American football fullback. He was drafted by the Green Bay Packers in the fifth round of the 2009 NFL Draft. Johnson was a part of the Packers' Super Bowl XLV championship team as they beat the Pittsburgh Steelers. He played college football at LSU.

He has also played for the Tennessee Titans and Denver Broncos.

Early years
Johnson attended West Saint John High School in Edgard, Louisiana, where he was a member of the Rams 2003 2A State Championship team.

Professional career

Green Bay Packers
Johnson was selected in the 5th round (145th overall) of the 2009 NFL Draft by the Packers.

Tennessee Titans
On September 3, 2011, Johnson was traded to the Tennessee Titans. He was released on October 7, 2011 to make room on the roster for fullback Ahmard Hall who was returning to the team from a four-game suspension.

Denver Broncos
On October 10, 2011, the Denver Broncos received Johnson off of waivers from the Tennessee Titans. Johnson was then waived by the Broncos and the Tennessee Titans claimed him off of waivers. On December 3, 2013, Johnson re-signed with the Titans.

Personal life
Johnson is cousins with Dillon Gordon who was an offensive guard for the Philadelphia Eagles and the Carolina Panthers, last appearing in 2019.

References

External links

Tennessee Titans bio
Green Bay Packers bio 
LSU Tigers bio

1986 births
Living people
Players of American football from Louisiana
American football fullbacks
LSU Tigers football players
Green Bay Packers players
People from Edgard, Louisiana
Tennessee Titans players
Denver Broncos players